Zeroville is a 2019 American comedy-drama film directed by James Franco, based on the 2007 novel of the same name by Steve Erickson. The film stars Franco, Megan Fox, Seth Rogen, Joey King, Danny McBride, Craig Robinson and Jacki Weaver.

The film was first announced in March 2011, but did not begin filming until October 2014. Originally set to be released in 2015 or 2016 by Alchemy, the distribution of the project was held off following the company's filing of Chapter 7 bankruptcy. It was eventually picked up by myCinema, and was released on September 20, 2019 in limited theaters, to largely negative reviews. The film was nominated for three Golden Raspberry Awards.

Plot
A young excommunicated seminarian named Vikar arrives in Los Angeles on August 9, 1969. After briefly being suspected of complicity in the Tate—LaBianca murders, which occurred the same day, Vikar takes a job at Paramount Studios, where he meets film editor Dotty Langer. Dotty senses potential in Vikar and introduces him to a studio executive known only as Viking Man. Vikar and Viking Man attend a Hollywood party, where Vikar meets actress Soledad Paladin, who he feels he has seen before.

When Vikar shows a talent for editing, an eccentric, singing producer named Rondell hires Vikar to edit Soledad's latest film. As Vikar becomes more involved in the industry, he becomes obsessed by the idea of a "secret movie," pieces of which lie hidden inside every film ever made.

The film traces Vikar's career over the next decade as he witnesses many significant events in the history of 1970s Hollywood.

Cast

Production 
In March 2011, the novel by Steve Erickson was optioned by actor James Franco for a feature film. On October 24, 2014, the ensemble cast joined the film, which includes Seth Rogen, Jacki Weaver, Megan Fox, Will Ferrell, Jamie Costa, Danny McBride, Dave Franco, Craig Robinson, Joey King and Horatio Sanz.

Filming
The principal photography of the film began on October 24, 2014, in Los Angeles, California. Filming also took place in Pasadena in November.

Release
On September 12, 2015, it was announced Alchemy had acquired US distribution rights to the film. However, the company filed for bankruptcy, leaving the film without a distributor. In April 2019, it was announced myCinema had acquired distribution rights to the film. It was released on September 20, 2019. The film is considered a box-office bomb.

Reception

Critical response
The website's consensus reads, "Potentially an ironic favorite for cult film fans, Zeroville is a fundamentally misguided -- and descriptively titled -- passion project for its director and star." On Metacritic, the film has a weighted average score of 28 out of 100, based on 13 critics, indicating "generally unfavorable reviews".
	
Peter Debruge  of Variety magazine wrote: "Franco has a truly radical streak in him, and considering how poorly the movie functions as a traditional crowdpleaser, he might as well have gone all out and pushed Zeroville to whatever event horizon the deranged project called for. His mistake wasn’t trying to adapt Erickson’s novel at all, but attempting to turn it into a tragic romance between Vikar and Soledad."

Accolades
The film was nominated for three Golden Raspberry Awards, James Franco was nominated for Worst Director and Worst Actor, and Seth Rogen was nominated for Worst Supporting Actor.

References

External links 
 

2019 films
2019 comedy-drama films
American comedy-drama films
2010s English-language films
Films based on American novels
Films directed by James Franco
Films set in 1969
Films set in the 1970s
Films set in 1979
Films set in 1980
Films set in Los Angeles
Films set in Manila
Films shot in Los Angeles
Cultural depictions of George Lucas
Cultural depictions of Marlon Brando
Cultural depictions of Steven Spielberg
Films about fandom
Films about film directors and producers
Films about filmmaking
2010s American films
English-language comedy-drama films